Vidhu Vincent is an Indian film director, writer, journalist and theatre activist from Kerala. She made her feature film debut with the Malayalam film Manhole, which won her that year's Kerala State Film Award for Best Director. At the 21st International Film Festival of Kerala, the film won two awards including the Best Debutant Director Award for Vincent.

Biography
Born in Kollam, After studying in Government College for Women, Thiruvananthapuram Vincent started her career as a television journalist with Asianet. During her stint with the channel, she was attracted towards documentaries and filmmaking which led to her eventually joining the Centre for Development of Imaging Technology, Thiruvananthapuram. Her reporting about Sand mining in Kerala, Endosulfan victims in Kasaragod and attack on women had generated widespread discussion in the Kerala Legislative Assembly and among general public in the State. She was a reporter with Asianet News when Muthanga incident took place in 2003, and she left her job and joined the movement. She was later arrested by the police for participating in Muthanga agitations. She took a break from her career to pursue degrees in Master of Social Work and Master of Arts (philosophy) before joining to daily journalism with a long reporting essay on "Society and Insurgency in Manipur, India" in 2014.

In 2010, Vincent became the first President of Penkoottu, an organization which highlights the plight of women employees in the unorganized sector. In 2017, she took a leadership role in the formation of Women in Cinema Collective as a response to the violence against female artist and workers in the Malayalam film industry.

Vincent has made a telefilm, Nadakaanthyam, in 2015 for MediaOne TV. The story was based on the life of a theatre actor and his struggle to meet the end in everyday life.  The short film won four major awards in the Kerala State Television Awards including Best Direction, Screenplay and the Best short film for the year 2015.

Vincent published a travelogue based on her travel to Germany in a graphic series on Nazism in a Malayalam weekly. The critically acclaimed series published in book form by Chintha Publishers titled Daivam Olivil Poya Naalukal . In 2014, she made a documentary, Vrithiyude Jathi (2014) for Media One. It highlights the plight of manual scavengers in Kerala. Inspired by true incidents, the film is based on the lives of scavengers who live in a neighbourhood of Kollam. Vincent adapted her award-winning documentary into a feature film by making her directorial debut with Manhole. The film entered the "International competition" section of the 21st International Film Festival of Kerala. Vincent became the first woman from Kerala to have a film screened in the history of the festival. At the festival, the film won two awards  the FIPRESCI Award for Best Malayalam Film and the "Silver Crow Pheasant Award" (Best Debutant Director) for Vincent. The film received the John Abraham award (special mention), which is instituted by the Kerala chapter of the Federation of Film Societies of India. In 2017, Vincent was bestowed upon with the Best Director Award at the 47th Kerala State Film Awards, and became the first woman to win a State Award in the category. She received the 2020 Kerala Sahitya Akademi Award for Travelogue for her work Daivam Olivil Poya Naalukal.

Filmography

See also
 List of female film and television directors

References

External links
 

Malayalam film directors
Indian women film directors
Film directors from Kerala
Year of birth missing (living people)
Living people
Indian women journalists
Kerala State Film Award winners
Indian documentary filmmakers
Indian television journalists
Journalists from Kerala
Artists from Kollam
Social workers
Activists from Kerala
21st-century Indian film directors
21st-century Indian women artists
21st-century Indian journalists
21st-century Indian women writers
21st-century Indian writers
Writers from Kollam
Women writers from Kerala
Social workers from Kerala
Women educators from Kerala
Educators from Kerala
Women documentary filmmakers
Women television journalists